The 1966 United States Senate special election in Virginia was held on November 8, 1966, alongside the other U.S. Senate election in Virginia. Incumbent Senator Harry F. Byrd Sr. had retired the previous year due to health reasons, and his son Harry F. Byrd Jr. had been appointed to replace him.  Byrd defeated Republican Lawrence M. Traylor and independent candidate John W. Carter, and was able to finish the balance of his father's sixth term.

Results

See also
 List of special elections to the United States Senate
 1966 United States Senate elections

References

Virginia (Special)
1966
Virginia 1966
United States Senate
Virginia 1966
United States Senate 1966